Stephen E. Higgins (born 1938) was the third Director of the Bureau of Alcohol, Tobacco and Firearms from 1983 to 1993, subsequently known as the Bureau of Alcohol, Tobacco, Firearms and Explosives (ATF).

Life and career
Higgins joined the IRS Alcohol and Tobacco Tax Division (ATTD), predecessor of ATF, in 1961 in Omaha, Nebraska. After serving as acting director, Higgins was appointed by Treasury Secretary Donald T. Regan in 1983. Higgins retired following a report faulting ATF for their handling of the Waco siege.

References

External links
Stephen Higgins--A Debt of Gratitude -- Hon. Jim Lightfoot (Extension of Remarks - October 05, 1993) via Library of Congress

1938 births
Living people
Waco siege
ATF agents